is the 13th studio album by Japanese entertainer Miho Nakayama. Released through King Records on March 15, 1991, it is Nakayama's fourth studio release (after One and Only, Mind Game, and Merry Merry) to not feature a single. The album's title is derived from the Japanese word , but stylized to sound Spanish to match the Latin music motif of the album.

The album peaked at No. 2 on Oricon's albums chart and sold over 125,000 copies.

Track listing 
All lyrics are written by Miho Nakayama, except where indicated; all music is arranged by ATOM, except where indicated.

Personnel
 Miho Nakayama – vocals
 Chuei Yoshikawa – guitar (1) 
 Yuzō Hayashi – keyboards (1)
 Nittoku Inoue – keyboards (6, 8)
 Hiroshi Narumi – keyboards (11)
 Shuichi "Ponta" Murakami – drums (6)
 Xácara – percussion (2)
 Saito Takeshi Group – strings (1)
 Jake Concepcion – saxophone (8)
 Shin Kazuhara – flugelhorn (4, 6)
 Nobuo Yagi – mouth harp (9)
 Jacky – backing vocals (2, 5)
 Kazumi Miyaura – backing vocals (2, 5)
 Junko Hirotani – backing vocals (8)
 Yuka Satō – backing vocals (9)

Charts

References

External links
 
 
 

1991 albums
Miho Nakayama albums
Japanese-language albums
King Records (Japan) albums